High Expectations/Low Results is the debut album by Canadian electronic rock band Faunts. It was released on October 18, 2005 on Friendly Fire Recordings. The album had been recorded independently years earlier, but was not widely distributed until the band was signed to Friendly Fire.

Track listing
"High Expectations" - 3:55
"Instantly Loved" - 5:46
"Memories of Places We've Never Been" - 4:09
"Place I've Found" - 5:24
"Parler de la Pluie et du Beau Temps" - 5:49
"Will You Tell Me Then" - 6:37
"Twenty-Three" - 8:58
"Gone with the Day" - 12:55
"Low Results" - 4:24

References

External links
Friendly Fire Recordings

2005 albums
Faunts albums